KS and variants may refer to:

Businesses and organizations
 , a German postwar commando frogman force
 , a Norwegian type of company
 Norwegian Association of Local and Regional Authorities
 PenAir, Peninsula Airways, Anchorage, Alaska, US (IATA airline code)

Language
 Kashmiri language, a Dardic language of Kashmir (ISO 639 alpha-2 language code "ks")
 Kernowek Standard, an orthography for Revived Cornish
 Kiasu, Hokkien (a Chinese spoken variant) word for 'extreme fear of losing' (怕输)
 Sound of the Latin letter X in many languages

Places 
 Kansas (US postal abbreviation KS)
 South Kalimantan, Indonesia (ISO 3166-2 province code)
 Krems an der Donau, Austria (vehicle plate code)
 Kassel, Germany (vehicle plate code)
 Khatumo State, an unrecognised proto-state in northern Somalia
 Northampton, Great Britain (vehicle plate code)
 Košice-okolie District, Slovakia (vehicle plate code)

Science, technology, and mathematics
 Kaposi's sarcoma, a tumor caused by Human herpesvirus 8 (HHV8)
 Kartagener syndrome, a genetic disorder
 Kallmann syndrome, a genetic disorder preventing the start or completion of puberty
 Keratan sulfate, any of several sulfated glycosaminoglycans
 Kernel streaming, a method of processing streamed data
 Ketoacyl synthase, a domain of polyketide synthases with a thiol group on a cysteine side-chain
 kilosample (kS), 1000 samples of a digitized signal
 Kilosecond (ks), 1000 seconds (16 minutes, 40 seconds)
 Klinefelter's Syndrome, caused by a chromosome aneuploidy
 Kolmogorov–Smirnov test, a goodness-of-fit test for probability distributions

Other uses
 Kammersänger, a German honorary title for a distinguished opera singer
 Kaplan–Sheinwold, a contract bridge bidding system
 Key Stage, a term used in the British education system
 Kill stealing, a practice in online games
 King's Scholar, at a UK public school
 King's Serjeant, an obsolete UK legal post
 Kirk/Spock or K/S, slash fiction
 Kashmiri Wikipedia, Wikipedia in Kashmiri-language
 Strikeouts, in baseball
 Contracts, in legal shorthand
 Slovak koruna, the currency of Slovakia 1993–2008 and of the 1939–1945 Slovak State
Ketfom elshemy, this is the adjective of balls in Egyptian culture.

See also
 K+S, a German chemical company